Frank Lombardino (January 27, 1927 – September 23, 1992) was an American politician who served in the Texas House of Representatives from 1967 to 1975 and in the Texas Senate from the 26th district from 1975 to 1979.

References

1927 births
1992 deaths
Democratic Party members of the Texas House of Representatives
Democratic Party Texas state senators
20th-century American politicians